Md. Sikandar Alam (Odia: ସିକନ୍ଦର ଆଲାମ; 27 July 1939 – 8 August 2010) was a playback singer in Odisha film industry (known as Ollywood). He is sometimes called the Salabega of modern Odisha.

In an interview with Monalisa Jena, he said, "I can't appreciate the changing trends where music has become an instrument of titillation with vulgar lyrics. True music soothes the frayed nerves and makes one forget one's mundane life".

Childhood and education
Alam was born on 27 July 1939 in Routrapur, Baialishi Mouzaa of Cuttack district. The family moved to Cuttack, where he completed his Matriculation at Christ Collegiate School and his Intermediate in Science at Stewart College. Sikandar then attended the Gandharva Mahavidyalaya to study vocal Hindustani classical music. He later studied Odissi music from Pt Balakrushna Dash.

Professional career
His first work in the entertainment industry was with All India Radio in 1957.  His debut in films was in the movie Laxmi (1964), directed by Balakrushna Dash. He sang in 50 Odia films, including Amada Bata, Adina Megha, Manika Jodi, Mamata, Suryamukhi and Puja, and recorded over 2,000 songs, earning the sobriquet "the Salabega of modern Odisha". He created a music album called Ala ke Huzur with his wife and daughter.

He had performed both in India and internationally. He is credited as the first Odia singer to be heard on BBC London.

On 8 August 2010, he died in a city nursing home in Bhubaneswar at the age of 71. He was admitted to the hospital due to prolonged illness.

Family
His father was an IPS officer. His wife Naima Alam, was from Kolkata. She was also a singer of Hindustani classical music, and worked at All India Radio. His eldest daughter Sophia Alam is a television actress and his youngest daughter Nazia Alam is an Odissi classical singer.

Awards and recognition
 1969 – Chitrapuri Award
 1980 – Soor Sagar Title from Sri Khetra Kala Prakashani, Puri
 1981 – Dharitri Samman
 1983 – Odisha Society of America
 1990 – Odisha State Film Award By Culture Department
 1991 – Santok Singh Award
 1991 – Cine Critic Award for Best Playback Singer
 1995 – Salabega Samman by Salabega Sanskrutika Parishad, Puri
 1999 – Chinta-O-Chetana Samman
 1999 – Award From Beach Festival, Chandipur
 2000 – Chalachitra Sahasrabadi Award
 2000 – Sarankul Art College & Music Samman
 2000 – Saraswati Samman from Balakrushna Das Foundation
 2000 – Odisha Sangeet Natak Academy Award
 2001 – Akashavani Abasara Binodana Kendra Award
 2001 – Soor Taranga Award
 2002 – Nehru Yuba Kendra Award
 2003 – Kalakar Boita Bandana Utshav, Angul
 2003 – Sangeet Shree Samman from P.R. Deptt., West Bengal
 2003 – Rajiv Gandhi Samman Award
 2003 – Rourkela Steel Plant Award
 2003 – Lion's Club Award
 2004 – Bani Chitra Award
 2004 – Akashya Mohanty Award
 2004 – Utkal Felicitation in Odisha Festival, Kolkata
 2005 – Shanti Devi Purskar, Bhadrak

References

Indian male playback singers
1939 births
2010 deaths
20th-century Indian composers
Singers from Odisha
Odia playback singers
People from Cuttack district
20th-century Indian male singers
20th-century Indian singers